The Samuel Hunt House is located in Rutland, Wisconsin.

History
The house was designed by Sereno W. Graves, later a member of the Wisconsin State Assembly. It was listed on the National Register of Historic Places in 1982 and on the State Register of Historic Places in 1989.

Other designs by Graves in Rutland, the Sereno W. Graves House, the Daniel Pond Farmhouse and the Lockwood Barn, are also listed on both registers.

References

Houses on the National Register of Historic Places in Wisconsin
National Register of Historic Places in Dane County, Wisconsin
Houses in Dane County, Wisconsin
Greek Revival architecture in Wisconsin
Italianate architecture in Wisconsin
Sandstone houses in the United States
Houses completed in 1855
1855 establishments in Wisconsin